The Halanaerobiales are an order of bacteria placed within the class Clostridia, and encompassing two families, the Halanaerobiaceae and the Halobacteroidaceae. Originally placed within the highly polyphyletic class Clostridia, according to the NCBI and LPSN, it is now thought to lie outside the Bacillota.  Halanaerobiales are halophilic obligate anaerobes with a fermentative or homoacetogenic metabolism.

Phylogeny
The currently accepted taxonomy is based on the List of Prokaryotic names with Standing in Nomenclature (LPSN) and National Center for Biotechnology Information (NCBI).

See also
 List of bacterial orders
 List of bacteria genera

References

Further reading 

 
Bacteria orders